Origami Angel is an American rock band from Washington D.C., consisting of singer and guitarist Ryland Heagy and drummer Pat Doherty.

History
The duo met in late 2015, when, after a show at Archie Edwards' Barbershop in Washington, D.C., Heagy and a friend asked Doherty to join their band Idle Empire, to which he accepted. Idle Empire eventually fizzled out, Heagy and Doherty later reuniting to form Origami Angel and releasing their debut EP titled Quiet Hours via Chatterbot Records. The band followed up this release with another EP in 2018 titled Doing The Most. In 2019, the duo released a Pokémon-themed EP titled Gen 3.

Origami Angel's debut full-length album, Somewhere City was released on November 15, 2019 to praise from critics and fans. Pitchfork gave the album a generally positive score of 7.0, writer Ian Cohen saying "Origami Angel never let up for more than five seconds save for the twinkly arpeggios that serve as Somewhere Citys introductory scene setting... Somewhere City is an invigorating place to spend a half hour, but Origami Angel would be wise to explore the darkness on the edge of town." Leor Galil for Chicago Reader complimented the album's energy, saying "Heagy and Doherty use their instrumental skills to work flamboyant, sometimes playful parts into neat, hook-filled songs, lending emotional resonance to what might otherwise seem like merely athletic displays."

On March 25, 2021, the band announced their sophomore double-album Gami Gang, releasing the lead single "Neutrogena Spektor" the following day. Gami Gang released on April 30, 2021 under Counter Intuitive Records, to generally positive reviews matching that of Somewhere City, receiving a positive score of 7.3 from Pitchfork.

Just a year and a half after their release of Gami Gang, Origami Angel unexpectedly released two surprise EPs, re: turn and DEPART. re: turn released September 30, 2022 aiming to showcase a stripped-back version of their band. Then, four days later on October 3, 2022, they released DEPART, a stark contrast to their previous release. DEPART is inspired by re: turn, as the duo wanted to further venture into their original sound.  In an interview with Consequence, Ryland says "we knew we were going to try a few songs in a more stripped-back acoustic fashion, but also thought it would be fun to explore a much heavier side of this band".

Influences
Heagy cites Barenaked Ladies, Yes, Prince Daddy & The Hyena, and Lil Uzi Vert as influences, alongside fellow D.C. emo bands like The Obsessives. Doherty cites Buddy Miles as his main influence.

Members
 Ryland Heagy – guitar, bass, vocals
 Pat Doherty – drums

DiscographyStudio albumsSomewhere City (2019, Counter Intuitive Records)
Gami Gang (2021, Counter Intuitive Records)EPsQuiet Hours (2017, Chatterbot Records)
Doing The Most (2018, Chatterbot Records)
Holy Split (2019, Counter Intuitive Records, collaboration with Commander Salamander)
Gen 3 (2019, Counter Intuitive Records)
Origami Angel Broke Minecraft (2020, Counter Intuitive Records, remix album)
Re: Turn (2022, Counter Intuitive Records)
DEPART (2022, Counter Intuitive Records) Singles'
"Hey There" (2017)
"Mark My Words" (2017)
"24 Hr Drive-Thru" (2019)
"Doctor Whomst" (2019)
"Jazzy Whomst" (2020, charity single)
"Neutrogena Spektor" (2021)
"Greenbelt Station" (2021)
"Footloose Cannonball Brothers" (2021)
"Blanket Statement" (2021)

References

Musical groups from Washington, D.C.
Musical groups established in 2017
Emo revival groups
American emo musical groups